The Surfers Paradise Hotel was the historic hotel that led to the development of Surfers Paradise in Queensland.

History 
During the 1920s, The Australian hotelier Jim Cavill (born James Freeman Cavill) purchased 10 acres of land in Elston (now Surfers Paradise). The land has previously been developed by previous owners but 1925 marked the openings of the Jubilee Bridge and the South Coast Road, opening up the area to a new flow of driving tourists. That year (or in 1928), Jim Cavill opened the Surfers Paradise Hotel, a 16-bedroom hotel located on the intersection of the South Coast Road and the old coach track. Two other hotels opened at the same time. The flow of tourism gave a new economic beat to the area and Elston quickly became a fully-fledged city.

Jim Cavill founded the Surfers Paradise Life Saving Club and the Surfers Paradise Progress Association in 1929.

In December 1933, Jim Cavill lobbied with locals to rename the city Elston to Surfers Paradise. In July1936, the timber-built hotel burned down and was entirely rebuilt in bricks the following year, reopening in September 1937 with telephones in every room. The street where the hotel stands was renamed Cavill Avenue in 1945.

On the location of the hotel now stands the Surfers Paradise Centre (Surfers Paradise Beer Garden and Hard Rock Cafe).

See also 

 Jim Cavill
 Surfers Paradise, Queensland

References 

Hotels in Queensland
Defunct hotels in Australia
Hotels established in 1925
1925 establishments in Australia
Surfers Paradise, Queensland